Atlético Saguntino (Spanish for 'Athletic Club of Sagunto') is a Spanish football team based in Sagunto, in the Valencian Community. Founded in 1951, in the 2019–20 season of Spanish football it plays in Tercera División RFEF – Group 6, holding home games at Camp Nou de Morvedre, with a 4,000-seat capacity.

History
On 1 July 1951, Atlético Club Saguntino was founded in the facilities of the Café Español with Enrique Aleixandre Calvo as president, Miguel Fuertes de la Asunción as vice president, José Felip in the position of secretary and José Mena as vice secretary. In April 2016, Atlético Saguntino finished for the first time as champion of the Group VI of the Tercera División and qualified, subsequently, to play the promotion playoffs to Segunda División B. It achieved the promotion to Segunda División B after beating Calahorra in a penalty shootout.

In the next season, Atlético Saguntino achieved its first national title ever after defeating Fuenlabrada in the Copa Federación de España final.

Season to season

2 seasons in Segunda División B
26 seasons in Tercera División
1 season in Tercera División RFEF

Current squad

Honours
Tercera División: 2015–16
Copa Federación de España: 2016–17

References

External links
Official website 
Futbolme team profile 

Football clubs in the Valencian Community
Association football clubs established in 1951
1951 establishments in Spain
Sagunto